Dolgy (masculine), Dolgaya (feminine), or Dolgoye (neuter) is the name of several inhabited localities in Russia.

Modern localities

Arkhangelsk Oblast
As of 2010, one rural locality in Arkhangelsk Oblast bears this name:
Dolgoye, Arkhangelsk Oblast, a village in Voznesensky Selsoviet of Primorsky District

Belgorod Oblast
As of 2010, five rural localities in Belgorod Oblast bear this name:
Dolgy, Belgorod Oblast, a khutor in Prokhorovsky District
Dolgoye, Gubkinsky District, Belgorod Oblast, a selo in Gubkinsky District
Dolgoye, Korochansky District, Belgorod Oblast, a khutor in Korochansky District
Dolgoye, Valuysky District, Belgorod Oblast, a selo in Kukuyevsky Rural Okrug of Valuysky District
Dolgoye, Veydelevsky District, Belgorod Oblast, a selo in Veydelevsky District

Bryansk Oblast
As of 2010, three rural localities in Bryansk Oblast bear this name:
Dolgy, Bryansk Oblast, a settlement in Pervomaysky Selsoviet of Karachevsky District
Dolgoye, Rognedinsky District, Bryansk Oblast, a village in Vladimirovsky Selsoviet of Rognedinsky District
Dolgoye, Surazhsky District, Bryansk Oblast, a settlement in Kulazhsky Selsoviet of Surazhsky District

Kaliningrad Oblast
As of 2010, one rural locality in Kaliningrad Oblast bears this name:
Dolgoye, Kaliningrad Oblast, a settlement in Alexeyevsky Rural Okrug of Krasnoznamensky District

Kaluga Oblast
As of 2010, four rural localities in Kaluga Oblast bear this name:
Dolgoye, Khvastovichsky District, Kaluga Oblast, a selo in Khvastovichsky District
Dolgoye, Mosalsky District, Kaluga Oblast, a village in Mosalsky District
Dolgoye, Ulyanovsky District, Kaluga Oblast, a village in Ulyanovsky District
Dolgaya, Kaluga Oblast, a village in Ulyanovsky District

Kostroma Oblast
As of 2010, one rural locality in Kostroma Oblast bears this name:
Dolgaya, Kostroma Oblast, a village in Belkovskoye Settlement of Vokhomsky District

Kurgan Oblast
As of 2010, one rural locality in Kurgan Oblast bears this name:
Dolgaya, Kurgan Oblast, a village in Talovsky Selsoviet of Yurgamyshsky District

Kursk Oblast
As of 2010, five rural localities in Kursk Oblast bear this name:
Dolgy, Bolshesoldatsky District, Kursk Oblast, a settlement in Lyubimovsky Selsoviet of Bolshesoldatsky District
Dolgy, Dmitriyevsky District, Kursk Oblast, a settlement in Selinsky Selsoviet of Dmitriyevsky District
Dolgy, Fatezhsky District, Kursk Oblast, a khutor in Kolychevsky Selsoviet of Fatezhsky District
Dolgoye, Kursky District, Kursk Oblast, a village in Klyukvinsky Selsoviet of Kursky District
Dolgoye, Zolotukhinsky District, Kursk Oblast, a selo in Svobodinsky Selsoviet of Zolotukhinsky District

Lipetsk Oblast
As of 2010, five rural localities in Lipetsk Oblast bear this name:
Dolgoye, Bigildinsky Selsoviet, Dankovsky District, Lipetsk Oblast, a selo in Bigildinsky Selsoviet of Dankovsky District
Dolgoye, Voskresensky Selsoviet, Dankovsky District, Lipetsk Oblast, a selo in Voskresensky Selsoviet of Dankovsky District
Dolgoye, Khlevensky District, Lipetsk Oblast, a selo in Dmitryashevsky Selsoviet of Khlevensky District
Dolgoye, Yeletsky District, Lipetsk Oblast, a selo in Volchansky Selsoviet of Yeletsky District
Dolgaya, Lipetsk Oblast, a village in Stebayevsky Selsoviet of Lipetsky District

Nizhny Novgorod Oblast
As of 2010, one rural locality in Nizhny Novgorod Oblast bears this name:
Dolgaya, Nizhny Novgorod Oblast, a village in Ananyevsky Selsoviet of Knyagininsky District

Novgorod Oblast
As of 2010, one rural locality in Novgorod Oblast bears this name:
Dolgoye, Novgorod Oblast, a village in Dolgovskoye Settlement of Moshenskoy District

Oryol Oblast
As of 2010, six inhabited localities in Oryol Oblast bear this name:
Dolgoye, Dolzhansky District, Oryol Oblast, an urban-type settlement in Dolzhansky District
Dolgoye, Mtsensky District, Oryol Oblast, a village in Alyabyevsky Selsoviet of Mtsensky District
Dolgoye, Sverdlovsky District, Oryol Oblast, a village in Yakovlevsky Selsoviet of Sverdlovsky District
Dolgoye, Verkhovsky District, Oryol Oblast, a village in Galichinsky Selsoviet of Verkhovsky District
Dolgoye, Zalegoshchensky District, Oryol Oblast, a selo in Lomovsky Selsoviet of Zalegoshchensky District
Dolgaya, Oryol Oblast, a village in Nizhne-Zalegoshchensky Selsoviet of Zalegoshchensky District

Pskov Oblast
As of 2010, one rural locality in Pskov Oblast bears this name:
Dolgaya, Pskov Oblast, a village in Velikoluksky District

Rostov Oblast
As of 2010, one rural locality in Rostov Oblast bears this name:
Dolgy, Rostov Oblast, a khutor in Maloorlovskoye Rural Settlement of Martynovsky District

Smolensk Oblast
As of 2010, two rural localities in Smolensk Oblast bear this name:
Dolgoye, Akatovskoye Rural Settlement, Gagarinsky District, Smolensk Oblast, a village in Akatovskoye Rural Settlement of Gagarinsky District
Dolgoye, Gagarinskoye Rural Settlement, Gagarinsky District, Smolensk Oblast, a village in Gagarinskoye Rural Settlement of Gagarinsky District

Tula Oblast
As of 2010, two rural localities in Tula Oblast bear this name:
Dolgoye, Kireyevsky District, Tula Oblast, a selo in Podosinovsky Rural Okrug of Kireyevsky District
Dolgoye, Leninsky District, Tula Oblast, a village in Inshinsky Rural Okrug of Leninsky District

Volgograd Oblast
As of 2010, two rural localities in Volgograd Oblast bear this name:
Dolgy, Leninsky District, Volgograd Oblast, a khutor in Pokrovsky Selsoviet of Leninsky District
Dolgy, Uryupinsky District, Volgograd Oblast, a khutor in Okladnensky Selsoviet of Uryupinsky District

Voronezh Oblast
As of 2010, two rural localities in Voronezh Oblast bear this name:
Dolgy, Voronezh Oblast, a khutor in Sinelipyagovskoye Rural Settlement of Nizhnedevitsky District
Dolgoye, Voronezh Oblast, a selo in Zemlyanskoye Rural Settlement of Semiluksky District

Abolished localities
Dolgy, Astrakhan Oblast, a rural locality (a settlement) in Mayachninsky Selsoviet of Ikryaninsky District of Astrakhan Oblast; abolished in August 2013

See also
Dolgaya Shchel
Dolgaya Spit